The Bakersfield Jammers, known originally as the San Jose Jammers, were an American professional basketball team that were members of the Continental Basketball Association (CBA) from 1989 to 1992. Originally based in San Jose, California, the team relocated to Bakersfield, California for their final season.

The team was created by former Oakland A's executive Fred Kuenzi through a CBA basketball league expansion. Although Fred was initially named as team spokesman and introduced as the team's first general manager, he had previous commitments that prohibited him from remaining on in that capacity. He served as a team consultant. Fred obtained capital investment funding by bringing in former assemblyman Dominic L. Cortese as majority owner. The Jammers' inaugural roster included high-scoring guards Freddie Banks (Las Vegas Silver Streaks) and Butch Hays, forward David Boone, and center Casey Crawford.

San Jose Jammers games were broadcast on radio station KSJX.

Season-by-season records

All-time roster

Leonard Allen
Larry Anderson
Freddie Banks
Scooter Barry
Perry Bellaire
David Boone
Jay Burson
Greg Butler
Ed Catchings
Chris Childs
Jervis Cole
Tank Collins
Jean Derouillere
Chip Engelland
Scott Fisher
Ray Foster
Rod Foster
Ben Gillery
Butch Hays
Jerome Henderson
Conner Henry
Marchell Henry
Keith Hill
Steffond Johnson
Steve Key
Bryan Kirkland
Kenny McClary
Ben McDonald
Scott Meents
Levy Middlebrooks
Richard Morton
Antwahn Nance
Terry Ross
Kelby Stuckey
Jon Taylor
Leonard Taylor
Darren Tillis
Mark Tillmon
Kenny Travis
John Tresvant
Kelvin Upshaw
Joe Wallace
Pearl Washington
Dan Williams
Sam Williams
Mike Yoest
Gus Gonidakis

Sources

See also
Bakersfield Jam – <n NBA D-League team that played from 2006 to 2016
San Jose Sky Rockets
San Jose Spiders

References

Basketball teams in the San Francisco Bay Area
Defunct basketball teams in California
Continental Basketball Association teams
Sports teams in San Jose, California
Sports in Bakersfield, California